The 1985 Skate America was held at St. Paul Civic Center in Saint Paul, Minnesota. Medals were awarded in the disciplines of men's singles, ladies' singles, pair skating, and ice dancing.

Results

Men

Ladies

Pairs

Ice dancing

External links
 Skate Canada results

Skate America, 1985
Skate America